Diocese (or Bishopric) of Antsiranana may refer to :

 the present Anglican Diocese of Antsiranana
 the precursor of the Roman Catholic Archdiocese of Antsiranana, which was called the Diocese of Diégo-Suarez